Robert "Bobby" Laing (born 17 September 1999) is a Scottish para badminton player who competes in international level events. He has won two medals in the mixed doubles alongside Rebecca Bedford and he has represented Great Britain at the World Dwarf Games.

Achievements

World Championships 

Men's doubles

Mixed doubles

European Championships 
Doubles

Mixed doubles

References

1999 births
Living people
People from Bathgate
Sportspeople from Livingston, West Lothian
Scottish male badminton players
British para-badminton players